UkrSpecSystems PD-2 is a Ukrainian multi-purpose unmanned aerial vehicle (UAV). It is designed for air reconnaissance and for combat use as a carrier of bombs with warheads weighing up to 3 kg. The aircraft can  take off from a runway, or be equipped with removable modules for vertical take-off and landing.

History 
From the start of the Russo-Ukrainian War in 2014, the Armed Forces of Ukraine saw the need for unmanned aerial vehicles, primarily for reconnaissance. Volunteers purchased civilian drones, which they used as-is or modified for military use.

The People's Project volunteer organization was established to help the Ukrainian military in eastern Ukraine. In attempting to import modern UAVs, the organization faced reluctance from some foreign companies to sell their devices. As an alternative, the unmanned aerial vehicle  was developed in cooperation with UkrSpecSystems. "PD" stands for "People's Drone".

In 2020, UkrSpecSystems developed the PD-2 drone, which is a deep modernization of the PD-1 with increasing payload, communication range and other improvements. It can climb to 3,000 metres and fly for up to 10 hours. It has a modular construction that allows additional motors to be fitted to convert it from runway-take-off to vertical take-off and landing.

References 

Twin-boom aircraft
Unmanned aerial vehicles of Ukraine
Reconnaissance aircraft
Military equipment of the 2022 Russian invasion of Ukraine